Of the 10 Wisconsin incumbents, 8 were re-elected, 1 retired, and 1 lost re-election.

See also 
 List of United States representatives from Wisconsin
 United States House of Representatives elections, 1972

1972
Wisconsin
1972 Wisconsin elections